DatalogZ (stylized as Datalogℤ) is an extension of Datalog with integer arithmetic and comparisons. The decision problem of whether or not a given ground atom (fact) is entailed by a Datalogℤ program is RE-complete (hence, undecidable), which can be shown by a reduction to diophantine equations.

Syntax 
The syntax of Datalogℤ extends that of Datalog with numeric terms, which are integer constants, integer variables, or terms built up from these with addition, subtraction, and multiplication. Furthermore, Datalogℤ allows , which are atoms of the form t < s or t <= s for numeric terms t, s.

Semantics 

The semantics of Datalogℤ are based on the model-theoretic (Herbrand) semantics of Datalog.

Limit Datalogℤ 
The undecidability of entailment of Datalogℤ motivates the definition of limit Datalogℤ. Limit Datalogℤ restricts predicates to a single numeric position, which is marked maximal or minimal. The semantics are based on the model-theoretic (Herbrand) semantics of Datalog.

Example 
Given a constant w, a binary relation edge that represents the edges of a graph, and a binary relation sp with the last position of sp minimal, the following limit Datalogℤ program computes the relation sp, which represents the length of the shortest path from w to any other node in the graph:

sp(w, 0) :- .
sp(y, m + 1) :- sp(x, m), edge(x, y).

See also 
 Constraint logic programming

References

Notes

Sources 
 
 
 

Logic in computer science
Computer programming